Kenny is a surname, a given name, and a diminutive of several different given names.

In Ireland, the surname is an Anglicisation of the Irish Ó Cionnaith, also spelt Ó Cionnaoith and Ó Cionaodha, meaning "descendant of Cionnaith". It was once popular in the 16th-century in Leinster, Munster, parts of Connacht and in County Tyrone in Ulster, and was Anglicised as O'Kenna, O'Kenny, O'Kinney, Kenna, Kenney, Kenny, and Kinney amongst other variations.

One bearer of the name was Cainnech of Aghaboe, better known in English as Saint Canice - a sixth-century Irish priest and missionary from near Dungiven, after whom the city and county of Kilkenny is also named. The Irish form Cill Chainnigh means "Church of Canice".

It is thought that the Ó Cionnaith sept was part of the Uí Maine kingdom, based in Connacht. Within this area, the name is associated traditionally with counties Galway and Roscommon.

Kenny is ranked at number 76 in the list of the most common surnames in Ireland. Other spellings include O'Kenny, Kenney, Kennie, Kinnie and Kinny.

The given name, Kenny, is most often used as a short form of the name Kenneth and a diminutive form of Ken.

Given name
Cainnech of Aghaboe (515/516–600), also known as Saint Kenny, Irish saint, abbot, monastic founder, priest and missionary
Kenny Adeleke (born 1983), Nigerian basketball player
Kenny Anderson (basketball) (born 1970), retired basketball player
Kenny Athiu, association footballer
Kenny Baker (English actor) (1934–2016), English actor, best known to portray R2-D2 in the Star Wars franchise.
Kenny Ball (1930–2013), English jazz musician
Kenny Bell (born 1992), American football player
Kenny Bernstein (born 1944), NHRA driver
Kenny Black (born 1963), Scottish footballer
Kenny Booker, American basketball player
Kenny Bräck (born 1966), former Swedish IndyCar driver
Kenny Chesney (born 1968), American country music singer, songwriter and record producer
Kenny Clarke (1914–1985), American jazz drummer and bandleader
Kenny Dalglish, Scottish soccer player and manager
Kenny Delmar (1910–1984), American actor and voice artist
Kenny Dillingham (born 1990), American football coach
Kenny Dykstra, American professional wrestler
Kenny Easley, American football player
Kenny Easterday (1973–2016), American man with sacral agenesis, known as "Man with half a body"
Kenny Edwards (rugby league) (born 1989), New Zealand Rugby League player
Kenny Everett (1944–1995), English disc-jockey and comedian
Kenny Fields (born 1962), American basketball player
Kenny Golladay (born 1993), American football player
Kenny Håkansson, Swedish musician
Kenny Heitz (1947–2012), American basketball player
Kenny Hotz, Canadian filmmaker and star of Kenny vs. Spenny
Kenny Hughes, actor, dancer, director and writer
Kenny Irwin Jr., former NASCAR driver
Kenny Jackett, English football player and manager
Kenny W. James, American voice actor
Kenny Kadji (born 1988), Cameroonian basketball player in the Israeli Basketball Premier League
Kenny Koplove, American baseball player
Kenny Lawler (born 1994), American football player
Kenny Layne (born 1981), American professional wrestler known also by ring-name Kenny King
Kenny Lofton, baseball outfielder
Kenny Loggins (born 1948), American singer and songwriter
Kenny Lowe, English football manager
Kenny Mayne, American sports journalist
Kenny McIntosh (born 2000), American football player
Kenny Middlemiss (born 1964), Scottish badminton player
Kenny Miller, Scottish footballer
Kenny Moore, American athlete
Kenny Moore (American football), American football player
Kenny O'Dell (1944–2018), American country music singer and songwriter
Kenny Okoro, American football player
Kenny Omega (born 1982), ring name of Canadian-born professional wrestler Tyson Smith
Kenny Ortega (born 1950), film director and producer
Kenny Perry, American professional golfer
Kenny Pickett (born 1998), American football player
Kenny Price (1931–1987), American country music singer-songwriter
Kenny Roberts, former motorcycle racer
Kenny Robinson, multiple people
Kenny Rogers (1938–2020), American country music singer-songwriter, guitarist and record producer
Kenny Sebastian, Indian comedian
Kenny Stucker, (born 1970) American football player
Kenny Taylor (basketball), (born 1992) basketball player for the Akita Northern Happinets of Japan
Kenny Tran, a professional Vietnamese American poker player
Kenny Vaccaro (born 1991), American football player
Kenny Wallace (born 1974), American NASCAR driver
Kenny Washington (basketball), American basketball player and coach
Kenny Willekes (born 1997), American football player
Kenny Wooten (born 1998), American basketball player
Kenny Yeboah (born 1998), American football player
Kenny Young (American football) (born 1994) American football player

Surname
 Anthony Kenny (born 1931), English philosopher
 Bernard Kenny (born 1946), American politician
 Bill Kenny (Australian footballer) (born 1897), Australian rules footballer
 Bill Kenny (English footballer), played at least one season in the American Soccer League
 Bill Kenny (singer) (1914–1978), African-American singer with The Ink Spots
 Brett Kenny, Australian rugby league footballer
 Brian Kenny (disambiguation)
 Charles Kenny (1898–1992), American composer and lyricist
 Charles Kenny (cricketer) (1929–96), English
 David Kenny (disambiguation)
 Enda Kenny (born 1951), Irish politician, leader of Fine Gael and Taoiseach
 Enda Kenny (singer), Irish-born Australian folksinger and songwriter
 Elizabeth Kenny (1880–1952), unaccredited Australian nurse whose controversial treatment of polio victims became the foundation of physical therapy
 Gerard Kenny, British-based American composer, pianist and singer
 Henry Kenny (1913–1975), Irish politician and Gaelic footballer
 Henry Kenny (Australian politician) (1853–1899)
 Henry Edward Kenny (1888–1979), British soldier awarded the Victoria Cross
 J. E. Kenny, Irish politician
 James Kenny (photographer), British photographer
 James C. Kenny, former US ambassador to Ireland 
 Jason Kenny (born 1988), English cyclist
 Jon Kenny, Irish comedian and actor
 Laura Kenny (born 1992), British track and road cyclist
 Lawrence Kenny, Catholic priest and exorcist
 Mark Kenny, former Irish footballer
 Matthew Joseph Kenny, Irish politician from Clare
 Maurice Kenny (born 1929), Mohawk poet
 Mecury Kenny (born 1979), Zimbabwean cricketer
 Michael Kenny (disambiguation), includes some Michaels better known as Mick or Mike
 Mick Kenny (Kilkenny hurler) (died 2003)
 Mike Kenny (writer), British playwright
 Nick Kenny (poet) (1895–1975), US columnist, lyricist & poet
 Nick Kenny (rugby league), Australian rugby league player
 Paddy Kenny, British-born Irish footballer
 Paddy Kenny (hurler), Irish hurler
 Pat Kenny (born 1948), Irish broadcaster
 Seán Kenny (hurler), Irish hurler
 Stephen Kenny (footballer), Irish football manager
 Tom Kenny (born 1962), American voice actor and comedian best-known as the voice of SpongeBob SquarePants
 Tom Kenny (hurler), Irish hurler
 William Kenny (disambiguation)

Fictional characters
 Kenny (Beyblade), in the anime and manga series Beyblade
 Kenny (Tomorrow People), in the 1970s science fiction series The Tomorrow People
 Kenny Ackerman, a character from Attack on Titan
 Kenny Chang, in the British web series Corner Shop Show.
 Kenny McCormick, a character from the TV series South Park
 Kenny Powers (character), the protagonist of the HBO series Eastbound and Down
 Kenny Rossmore, a character in the 2013 American crime comedy movie We're the Millers
 Kenny Smyth, a corporate bathroom plumber in the 2006 film Kenny
 Kenny Wangler, an African-American drug addict in the HBO drama Oz
 Kenny, in the movie Let Me In
 Kenny, in the episodic video game series The Walking Dead: Season One
 Kenny the Shark, from Kenny the Shark
 Kenny (Kouji), from Stitch!

See also
 Ken (given name)
 Kenney (disambiguation)
 Kinney (disambiguation)
 List of Irish-language given names

References

 Genealogies of Kenny and Lysaght by Cecil Stacpoole Kenny 1915, NLI, Dublin, Ireland

English masculine given names
English-language surnames
Masculine given names
Hypocorisms
Surnames of Irish origin
Anglicised Irish-language surnames